Simona Halep was the defending champion, but lost in the semifinals to Elina Svitolina.

Svitolina went on to win the title, defeating Caroline Wozniacki in the final, 6–4, 6–0. This marked Svitolina's third consecutive Premier 5 title, making her the first woman to ever win the first three Premier 5 tournaments in a single season, as well as the first to win three consecutive Premier 5 tournaments since Wozniacki won Montreal and Tokyo in 2010 and Dubai in 2011. This was also Wozniacki's sixth consecutive loss in a final in 2017, making her the first to lose that many finals in a row in one season in history, as well as the first woman to lose six finals in a single season since Maria Sharapova in 2012.

Seeds
The top eight seeds received a bye into the second round.

Draw

Finals

Top half

Section 1

Section 2

Bottom half

Section 3

Section 4

Qualifying

Seeds

Qualifiers

Lucky loser
  Magdaléna Rybáriková

Qualifying draw

First qualifier

Second qualifier

Third qualifier

Fourth qualifier

Fifth qualifier

Sixth qualifier

Seventh qualifier

Eighth qualifier

Ninth qualifier

Tenth qualifier

Eleventh qualifier

Twelfth qualifier

References
Main Draw
Qualifying Draw

Women's Singles